Thebes or Thebae may refer to one of the following places:

Thebes, Egypt, capital of Egypt under the 11th, early 12th, 17th and early 18th Dynasties
Thebes, Greece, a city in Boeotia
Phthiotic Thebes or Thessalian Thebes, an ancient city at Nea Anchialos
Thebae (Cilicia), a town of ancient Cilicia, now in Turkey
Thebes (Ionia), in Asia Minor
Cilician Thebe, a.k.a. Thebe Hypoplakia, a mythological city in the Trojan Cilicia, near the Troad
Thebes, Illinois, a village in the United States

See also
Thebe (disambiguation)